NS12, NS-12, NS 12, NS.12, or variation, may refer to:

Places
 Canberra MRT station (station code: NS12), Sembawang, Singapore
 Kōfūdai Station (Osaka) (station code: NS12), Toyono, Toyono District, Osaka Prefecture, Japan
 Hanuki Station (station code: NS12), Ina, Saitama, Japan
 Cole Harbour-Eastern Passage (constituency N.S. 12), Nova Scotia, Canada
 Coronie District (FIPS region code NS12), Suriname

Other uses
 Blue Origin NS-12, a 2019 December 11 Blue Origin suborbital spaceflight mission for the New Shepard
 RAF N.S. 12, a British NS class airship
 SSOR NS12, a low-floor electric bus; see List of electric bus makers and models
 New Penguin Shakespeare volume 12

See also

 NS (disambiguation)
 12 (disambiguation)